Samhwasa is a Buddhist temple of the Jogye Order in Gangwon, South Korea.

History 
Wang Geon's Prayers for the Unification of the Later Three Kingdoms

Samhwasa Temple (Korean: 삼화사, Chinese: 三和寺, Pronounced “Sam-hwa-sa”) was established by Ven. Jajang Yulsa in 642. Initially named Heungnyeondae it was renamed Samgongam Hermitage in 864 when National Preceptor Ven. Beomil Guksa  reconstructed it, and the temple's role also changed from being a Doctrinal School to a Seon School. It was in Samgongam Hermitage that Wang Geon, the future King Taejo of Goryeo, prayed for the unification of the later three kingdoms. When he actually achieved unification, he renamed the temple Samhwasa (lit. “Harmony of the Three” Temple) in the sense that Goryeo, Later Baekje and Silla would end their ongoing conflict and coexist in harmony.

When Yi Seong-gye founded Joseon after destroying Goryeo's regal power, he had King Gongyang and the last of his followers drowned in the ocean in front of Samcheok. To console their ghosts, Samhwasa Temple was tasked with offering the Water and Land Ceremony (Suryukjae)  after the founding of Joseon.

Later in 1747, Samhwasa Temple was damaged by floods and landslides. After relocation to a higher site, it was destroyed by fire in 1820, but was reconstructed again in 1824. In 1907, the temple was torched by the Japanese army under the pretext that some militia men were staying there. Many buildings, including the Main Buddha Hall and Seon Hall, about 200 bays in size, were destroyed.

There are many historical relics and legends related to Samhwasa Temple. The Jewang ungi (帝王韻紀; Songs of Emperors and Kings) was written by Yi Seung-hyu  who promoted a spirit of nationalism in the later Goryeo era. After concentrating on reading sutras for 10 years in his house, he then donated it to Samhwasa Temple; it was later transformed into Ganjangam Hermitage

Cultural properties 
Iron Rocana Buddha and Idu Script

Samhwasa Temple's cultural heritage includes: a Three-Story Stone Pagoda (Treasure No. 1277); an Iron Seated Rocana Buddha (Treasure No.1292) ; the stupa of Ven. Sangjun Daesa; and the stupa and stele of Ven. Wongokdang Daeseonsa. The Three-Story Stone Pagoda, which stands 4.95 meters (16 feet) high, and belongs to the Goryeo era, radiates stability with its well-balanced proportions.

The Rocana Buddha is an iron Buddha produced during the Unified Silla era. It was originally thought to be a Medicine Buddha, but later, an inscribed text was found on its back, revealing it was actually a Rocana Buddha (盧舍那佛) created in the mid-9th century. The text was inscribed in Idu script, an archaic writing system representing the Korean language using Chinese characters. As it shows an actual example of Idu script, which was used around the 10th century, the statue has significant meaning in terms of Korean linguistics as well; it was designated Treasure No. 1292 in 1998.

Tourism  
It also offers temple stay programs where visitors can experience Buddhist culture.

Gallery

References

External links
 Samhwasa official website(in Korean)

Buddhist temples of the Jogye Order
Buddhist temples in South Korea